Derek Middleton (born 30 May 1934) is an English former professional footballer who played as a defender in the Football League for York City and in non-League football for Whitwick Colliery and Burton Albion.

References

1934 births
Living people
People from Ashby-de-la-Zouch
Footballers from Leicestershire
English footballers
Association football midfielders
Whitwick Colliery F.C. players
Burton Albion F.C. players
York City F.C. players
English Football League players